Syed Thaha is a Singapore international football player who plays for Balestier Khalsa.

Club career
Previously, he played for Young Lions and Geylang United.

International career
Played for the National Team in 2006 by appearing as a substitute is his only cap to date for the National Team.

Honours
Geylang United
 Singapore Cup: 2009

Balestier Khalsa
 Singapore Cup: 2014
 League Cup: 2013

External links

Singaporean footballers
Singapore international footballers
Geylang International FC players
Living people
1985 births
Association football defenders
Balestier Khalsa FC players
Singapore Premier League players
Young Lions FC players